Tiexi District may refer to the following locations in China's Northeast:

 Tiexi District, Anshan, Liaoning
 Tiexi District, Shenyang, Liaoning
 Tiexi District, Siping, Jilin Province